Babao may refer to
Babao seal paste, a traditional Chinese handicraft
2013 Babao Coal Mine explosions in China
Christine Bersola-Babao (born 1970), Filipino journalist
Julius Babao (born 1968), Filipino journalist